Aotearoa is the current Māori-language name for New Zealand. The name was originally used by Māori in reference to only the North Island, with the name of the whole country being Aotearoa me Te Waipounamu ("North Island and South Island"). In the pre-European era, Māori did not have one name for the country as a whole.

Several meanings for Aotearoa have been proposed for the name; the most popular translation usually given is "land of the long white cloud", or variations thereof. This refers to the cloud formations which helped early Polynesian navigators find the country.

Beginning in the late 20th century, Aotearoa has become widespread in the bilingual names of national organisations and institutions. Since the 1990s, it has been customary for particular parties to sing the New Zealand national anthem, "God Defend New Zealand" (or "Aotearoa"), in both Māori and English, exposing the name to a wider audience.

Origin
One literal translation is 'long white cloud', commonly lengthened to 'the land of the long white cloud'. Alternative translations are 'long bright world' or 'land of abiding day', possibly referring to New Zealand having longer summer days in comparison to those further north in the Pacific Ocean.

The first Māori dictionary, published in 1844, had no entry for Aotearoa. By the 1870s "Aotearoa" became synonymous for the region widely known as the King Country. One King Movement flag also has the words Niu Tireni on it. By the 1860s there are examples of the use of the phrase "the island of Aotearoa" meaning the North Island. This usage continued throughout the century. The setting up of King Tawhio's Great Council, or Kauhanganui, in 1892 comprised, it claimed, "the Kingdom of Aotearoa and the Waiponamu", meaning both the North and South Islands. It is likely that King Movement political aspirations may lie behind the claimed increasing geographic size of the region purported to be Aotearoa. While many Māori throughout New Zealand may have been in support of the King Movement's general aims, most were far too independent to kowtow to its mana. At least one acerbic commentator noted Tāwhiao's nation-wide "constitution" for "the Maori Kingdom of Aotearoa" amounted only to "practically what is termed the King country".

Thomas Bracken's New Zealand anthem of 1878 was translated into Māori by T.H. Smith. New Zealand he called Aotearoa. This meaning was further entrenched with W.P. Reeves' 1898 history of New Zealand with the title Aotearoa: The Long White Cloud. James Cowan's 1907 version is entitled New Zealand, or Ao-te-roa (The Long Bright World). Johannes Anderson, in the same year, published Māori Life in Aotea.

New Zealand in the later nineteenth century saw many non-Māori efforts to give it another name that best suited the perceived emerging national character, now that most of the non-Māori population had been born in the country – suggestions included Maoria, Maoriland, Zealandia, Aotearoa.

The suggested Aotearoa, first popularised among Pākehā by Bracken's translated anthem, and Reeves' history, drew similar sorts of conflicting responses to those still heard today. Some newspaper correspondents at the time thought Aotearoa was "euphonious and beautiful, and is not a change, but a reversion to the original Nu Tirene".

Mythology
In some traditional stories, Aotearoa was the name of the canoe of the explorer Kupe, and he named the land after it. Kupe's wife Kuramārōtini (in some versions, his daughter) was watching the horizon and called  ('a cloud! a cloud!'). Other versions say the canoe was guided by a long white cloud in the course of the day and by a long bright cloud at night. On arrival, the sign of land to Kupe's crew was the long cloud hanging over it. The cloud caught Kupe's attention and he said "Surely is a point of land". Due to the cloud which greeted them, Kupe named the land Aotearoa.

Usage
It is not known when Māori began incorporating the name into their oral lore. Beginning in 1845, George Grey, Governor of New Zealand, spent some years amassing information from Māori regarding their legends and histories. He translated it into English, and in 1855 published a book called Polynesian Mythology and Ancient Traditional History of the New Zealand Race. In a reference to Māui, the culture hero, Grey's translation from the Māori reads as follows:

Thus died this Maui we have spoken of; but before he died he had children, and sons were born to him; some of his descendants yet live in Hawaiki, some in Aotearoa (or in these islands); the greater part of his descendants remained in Hawaiki, but a few of them came here to Aotearoa.

The use of Aotearoa to refer to the whole country is a post-colonial custom. Before the period of contact with Europeans, Māori did not have a commonly used name for the entire New Zealand archipelago. As late as the 1890s the name was used in reference to the North Island (Te Ika-a-Māui) only; an example of this usage appeared in the first issue of Huia Tangata Kotahi, a Māori-language newspaper published on February 8, 1893. It contained the dedication on the front page, "He perehi tenei mo nga iwi Maori, katoa, o Aotearoa, mete Waipounamu", meaning "This is a publication for the Māori tribes of the North Island and the South Island".

After the adoption of the name New Zealand (anglicised from Nova Zeelandia) by Europeans, one name used by Māori to denote the country as a whole was Niu Tireni, a respelling of New Zealand derived from an approximate pronunciation.

The expanded meaning of Aotearoa among Pākehā became commonplace in the late 19th century. Aotearoa was used for the name of New Zealand in the 1878 translation of "God Defend New Zealand", by Judge Thomas Henry Smith of the Native Land Court—this translation is widely used today when the anthem is sung in Māori. Additionally, William Pember Reeves used Aotearoa to mean New Zealand in his history of the country published in 1898, The Long White Cloud Ao-tea-roa.

Since the late 20th century Aotearoa is becoming widespread also in the bilingual names of national organisations, such as the National Library of New Zealand / Te Puna Mātauranga o Aotearoa.

In 2015, to celebrate Te Wiki o te Reo Māori (Māori Language Week), the Black Caps (the New Zealand national cricket team) played under the name Aotearoa for their first match against Zimbabwe.

Music
 Aotearoa is an overture composed in 1940 by Douglas Lilburn. 
 The Land of the Long White Cloud, subtitled Aotearoa, is a piece composed in 1979 by Philip Sparke for brass band or wind band.
 "Aotearoa" is the Māori version of "God Defend New Zealand", a national anthem of New Zealand.
 Split Enz refers to Aotearoa in its 1982 song "Six Months in a Leaky Boat".

Petitions 
A petition initiated by David Chester was presented to the parliament on 13 April 2018, requesting legislation to change the name of New Zealand to  Aotearoa – New Zealand.

A further petition initiated by Danny Tahau Jobe for a referendum on whether the official name of New Zealand should change to include Aotearoa, received 6,310 signatures. The petition was presented to Parliament by the Green Party of Aotearoa New Zealand co-leader Marama Davidson on 1 May 2019.

The petitions were considered together by  Parliament's Governance and Administration Select Committee which responded that it acknowledged the significance of the name "Aotearoa" and that it is increasingly being used to refer to New Zealand. The committee also noted that there are references throughout legislation to both "Aotearoa" and "New Zealand" and that while not legislated, the use of bilingual titles throughout Parliament and government agencies is common. The final report stated, "at present we do not consider that a legal name change, or a referendum on the same change, is needed".

In September 2021 the Māori Party started a petition to change the name of New Zealand to Aotearoa. The petition reached 50,000 signatures in two days.

In September 2021, Hobson's Pledge, a lobby group that opposes specific rights for Māori (led by former leader of the New Zealand National Party Don Brash), initiated a petition to eradicate "Aotearoa" from official use. Hobson's Pledge spokespersons Casey Costello and Don Brash called on Prime Minister Jacinda Ardern to publicly affirm that the official name of the country is New Zealand, not Aotearoa New Zealand or Aotearoa. The petition also called on the prime minister to instruct all government departments to use the current official name only. Costello claimed that the name Aotearoa was not "culturally or historically recognised by Māori as the name of our country" while Brash claimed that the name New Zealand was an identity and brand that had been built over the past 180 years. The petition gained over 115,000 signatures by February 2023.

In September 2021, Winston Peters, leader of the New Zealand First Party launched a petition "Keep It New Zealand". Peters called Aotearoa a "name with no historical credibility".  the petition gained over 21,000 signatures.

By early June 2022, the Māori Party's petition to rename New Zealand "Aotearoa" had received over 70,000 signatures. On 2 June, the petition was submitted before Parliament's committee. Party co-leader Rawiri Waititi argued that the proposed name change would recognise New Zealand's indigenous heritage and strengthen its identity as a Pacific country. Waititi objected to the idea of a referendum, claiming it would entrench the "tyranny of the majority." National Party Christopher Luxon stated that renaming New Zealand was a constitutional issue that would require a referendum. Māori Development Minister Willie Jackson expressed concerns that a potential name change would create branding issues for the country's tourism industry.

Opinion polling 
A 1 News–Colmar Brunton poll in September 2021 found that 58% of respondents wanted to keep the name "New Zealand", 9% wanted to change the name to "Aotearoa", and 31% wanted the joint name of "Aotearoa New Zealand". A January 2023 Newshub-Reid Research poll, showed a slight increase in support for the name "Aotearoa", with 36.2% wanting 'Aotearoa New Zealand", 9.6% "Aotearoa" only, and 52% wanting to keep "New Zealand" only.

See also 

 List of New Zealand place name etymologies
 New Zealand place names

Explanatory notes

References

External links 
 

Country name etymology
Māori words and phrases
New Zealand culture